Il Bel Sogno is the debut album of Albanian opera singer Inva Mula, released on October 6, 2009. It features music composed by Giacomo Puccini, Charles Gounod, Jules Massenet, and Giuseppe Verdi, performed by Inva Mula (soprano) and Agim Hushi (tenor) with the Zagreb Philharmonic Orchestra conducted by Ivo Lipanović. The album took its name from the album's first song, "Chi il bel sogno di Doretta" from Puccini's La rondine.

The album received mixed critical feedback.

Track listing

References

External links

2009 classical albums
Opera recordings
Classical music compilation albums